Aarón Gamal (8 January 1959 – 16 March 2021) was a Mexican footballer who played in the Liga MX. He also played for the Mexico national team at junior and senior levels.

Club career
Born in Suaqui Grande, Gamal played both baseball and football as a youth. He began his professional footballing career with Deportivo Neza, and in 1981, he became the first person from Hermosillo to play in the Primera División. Gamal joined Ángeles de Puebla before joining Tigres de la UANL, the latter would win the Copa de México and he retiring in 1992.

International career
Gamal made two appearances for the Mexico national football team from 1984 to 1985. His debut with the senior team was a friendly against the United States. He also played for Mexico at the 1981 FIFA World Youth Championship in Australia.

Personal life
After he retired from playing, Gamal became a youth football coach. He has worked with Tigres' youth teams. 

Aaron Gamal died on 16 March 2021 from a heart attack. He was 62 years old.

References

External links
 

1959 births
2021 deaths
People from Suaqui Grande Municipality
Footballers from Sonora
Association football defenders
Mexican footballers
Mexico youth international footballers
Mexico international footballers
Coyotes Neza footballers
Club Puebla players
Tigres UANL footballers